Naserabad-e Chahgavari (also Romanized as Nāşerābād-e Chahgavārī; also known as Nāşerābād) is a village in Gonbaki Rural District, Gonbaki District, Rigan County, Kerman Province, Iran. At the 2006 census, its population was 609, in 127 families.

References 

Populated places in Rigan County